Camera Silens was a French punk band from Bordeaux active between 1981 and 1988.

Their singer and bassist, Gilles Bertin took part in a bank robbery in Toulouse on 27 April 1988, where nearly 12 million francs were stolen. Gilles Bertin went on the run for 28 years before handing himself in to police.

References

French punk rock groups
French bank robbers
Musical groups established in 1981
Musical groups disestablished in 1988
Musical groups from Bordeaux
Oi! groups